Political warfare is the use of political means to compel an opponent to do one's will, based on hostile intent. The term political describes the calculated interaction between a government and a target audience, including another state's government, military, and/or general population. Governments use a variety of techniques to coerce certain actions, thereby gaining relative advantage over an opponent. The techniques include propaganda and psychological operations ("PsyOps"), which service national and military objectives respectively. Propaganda has many aspects and a hostile and coercive political purpose. Psychological operations are for strategic and tactical military objectives and may be intended for hostile military and civilian populations.

Political warfare's coercive nature leads to weakening or destroying an opponent's political, social, or societal will, and forcing a course of action favorable to a state's interest. Political war may be combined with violence, economic pressure, subversion, and diplomacy, but its chief aspect is "the use of words, images and ideas". The creation, deployment, and continuation of these coercive methods are a function of statecraft for nations and serve as a potential substitute for more direct military action. For instance, methods like economic sanctions or embargoes are intended to inflict the necessary economic damage to force political change. The utilized methods and techniques in political war depend on the state's political vision and composition. Conduct will differ according to whether the state is totalitarian, authoritative, or democratic.

The ultimate goal of political warfare is to alter an opponent's opinions and actions in favour of one state's interests without utilizing military power. This type of organized persuasion or coercion also has the practical purpose of saving lives through eschewing the use of violence in order to further political goals. Thus, political warfare also involves "the art of heartening friends and disheartening enemies, of gaining help for one's cause and causing the abandonment of the enemies'". Generally, political warfare is distinguished by its hostile intent and through potential escalation; but the loss of life is an accepted consequence.

Tools

Peaceful

Political warfare utilizes all instruments short of war available to a nation to achieve its national objectives. The best tool of political warfare is "effective policy forcefully explained", or more directly, "overt policy forcefully backed". But political warfare is used, as one leading thinker on the topic has explained, "when public relations statements and gentle, public diplomacy-style persuasion—the policies of 'soft power'—fail to win the needed sentiments and actions" around the world.
The major way political warfare is waged is through propaganda. The essence of these operations can be either overt or covert. "White" or overt propaganda comes from a known source. "Gray" propaganda, on the other hand, is the "semiofficial amplification of a government's voice". Radio Free Europe and Radio Liberty are examples of "gray" propaganda during the Cold War. "Black" propaganda, however, is propaganda which originates from an unknown source. The key to black propaganda is the fact that it most often "appears to come from a disinterested source when in fact it does not".

There are channels which can be used to transmit propaganda. Sophisticated use of technology allows an organization to disseminate information to a vast number of people. The most basic channel is the spoken word. This can include live speeches or radio and television broadcasts. Overt or covert radio broadcasting can be an especially useful tool. The printed word is also very powerful, including pamphlets, leaflets, books, magazines, political cartoons, and planted newspaper articles (clandestine or otherwise). Subversion, agents of influence, spies, journalists, and "useful idiots" can all be used as powerful tools in political warfare.

Aggressive

Political warfare also includes aggressive activities by one actor to offensively gain relative advantage or control over another. Between nation states, it can end in the seizure of power or in the open assimilation of the victimized state into the political system or power complex of the aggressor. This aggressor-victim relationship has also been seen between rivals within a state and may involve tactics like assassination, paramilitary activity, sabotage, coup d'état, insurgency, revolution, guerrilla warfare, and civil war.

Foreign infiltration or liberation occurs when a government is overthrown by foreign military or diplomatic intervention, or through covert means. The campaign's ultimate purpose is to gain control over another nation's political and social structure. The campaign could be led by the aggressor's national forces or by a political faction favorable to the aggressor within the other state. Paul M. Blackstock describes three stages involved in the extension of control by the aggressor over the victim:
Penetration or infiltration: the deliberate infiltration of political and social groups within a victim state by the aggressor with the ultimate purpose of extending influence and control. The aggressor conceals its endgame, which goes beyond the normal influential nature of diplomacy and involves espionage.
Forced disintegration or atomization: "is the breakdown of the political and social structure of the victim until the fabric of national morale disintegrates and the state is unable to resist further intervention". The aggressor may exploit the inevitable internal tensions between political, class, ethnic, religious, racial, and other groups. This concept is a similar strategy to 'divide and conquer'.
Subversion and defection: Subversion is the "undermining or detachment of the loyalties of significant political and social groups within the victimized state, and their transference to the political or ideological causes of the aggressor". In lieu of total and direct transference, the aggressor may accept intermediate states that still meets its objectives, such as the favor of politically significant individuals. Furthermore, the formation of a counter-elite, made up of influential individuals and key leaders, within the victim state establishes the legitimacy and permanency of a new regime. Defection is the transference of allegiance of key individuals and leaders to the aggressor's camp. The individual could relocate or stay-in-place in the victim country, continually influencing local issues and events in the aggressor's favor. Defectors also provide insider information to the aggressor.

Coup d'état is the overthrowing of a government through the infiltration of the political, military, and social groups by a small segment of the state apparatus. The small segment exists within the state and targets the critical political levers of power within a government to neutralize opposition to the coup and post-coup governing force. Several pre-existing factors are necessary for a coup: political participation being limited to a small portion of the population, independence from foreign power influence and control, and power and decision-making authority concentrated within a political center and not diffused between regional authorities, businesses, or other groups.
A coup utilizes political resources to gain support within the existing state and neutralize or immobilize those who are capable of rallying against the coup. A successful coup occurs rapidly and after taking over the government, stabilizes the situation by controlling communications and mobility. Furthermore, a new government must gain acceptance from the public and military and administrative structures, by reducing the sense of insecurity. Ultimately, the new government will seek legitimacy in the eyes of its own people as well as seek foreign recognition. The coup d'état can be led by national forces or involve foreign influence, similar to foreign liberation or infiltration.

Paramilitary Operations: transitional political warfare ranging from small-scale use of violence with primitive organizational structure (e.g. sabotage) to full-scale conventional war. The transition and escalation includes a series of stages and depends on tactical and strategic objectives. Paramilitary activities include infiltration and subversion as well as small group operations, insurrection, and civil war.
Insurgency: an organized, protracted political warfare tool designed to weaken the control and eliminate the legitimacy of an established government, occupying power, or other political authority. An insurgency is an internal conflict, and the primary struggle is to mobilize local populations for political control and gain popular support towards the insurgents' cause. Insurgencies include political and military objectives, with the end goal of establishing a legitimate, rival state structure. Insurgencies are unconventional military conflicts which incorporate a variety of methods, ranging from coercive tools like intimidation and assassination, to political tools like propaganda and social services. An insurgency's approaches and objectives could involve perpetual disorder and violence demonstrating the government's inability to provide security for the populace, weakening the government and killing or intimidating any effective opposition against the government, intimidating the population and discouraging its participation in – or support for – political or legal processes, controlling or intimidating police and military forces (which limits their ability to respond to insurgent attacks) or by creating government repression by provoking over-reactions by security or military forces.

In antiquity

The history of political warfare can be traced to antiquity. The Chinese general and strategist Sun Tzu captures its essence in the ancient Chinese military strategy book, The Art of War: "So to win a hundred victories in a hundred battles is not the highest excellence; the highest excellence is to subdue the enemy's army without fighting at all...The expert in using the military subdues the enemy's forces without going to battle, takes the enemy's walled cities without launching an attack, and crushes the enemy's state without protracted war."

There are abundant examples of political warfare in antiquity. In ancient Greece, a famous example is that of the Trojan Horse, which used deception for tactical military objectives. Propaganda was commonly utilized, including Greek rhetoric and theatre which used words and images to influence populations throughout the Hellenic world. This practice has left a lasting legacy of speech as a mechanism of political power, greater than force in solving disputes and inducing submission. During this same period, Alexander the Great used coinage imprinted with his own image, indirectly forcing conquered nations to accept his legitimacy as national ruler and to unite disparate nations together under his dominion.

Ancient Rome utilized similar political warfare as the Greeks including rhetoric, as displayed by Cicero; and art, as seen in coinage, statues, architecture, engineering, and mosaics. All of these elements were intended to portray Rome's imperial dominance over its subject nations and the superior nature of Roman society. Following a religious vision, the emperor Constantine I in 330 CE bound the Roman state to the universal Christian Church. In doing so, he linked "religious commitment with imperial ambition" that proved to be quite successful and powerful. One long-lasting symbol of this is the Chi Rho, which forms the first two letters of the Greeks' name for Christ. This symbol was used for over one thousand years by Constantine's successors as a symbol of "imperial majesty and divine authority" and still is a powerful symbol within Christianity.

By country

China

China's political leaders during this century have had to first create a nation before they could proceed to contend with other national actors in the international arena. Consequently, insofar as both the Chinese Communist Party and the Kuomintang subscribed to a political warfare concept during their formative years of struggle, the concept was as much concerned with creating national identity and defeating domestic adversaries as it was with China's ability to compete in the world. Since the founding of the PRC in 1949 they have centered much of their political warfare efforts within the United Front Work Department. The Chinese conception of political warfare includes the "Three Warfares" of public opinion warfare, psychological warfare, and legal warfare, among others.

Taiwan remains a major target of PRC political warfare efforts. China's political warfare campaign aims to isolate Taiwan from the international community and interfere in Taiwan's democratic system and institutions. India has also become a target of increasing importance for PRC influence operations.

Soviet Union and Russia

Throughout the Cold War, the Soviet Union was committed to political warfare on classic totalitarian lines and continued to utilize propaganda towards internal and external audiences. "Active measures" (Russian: Активные мероприятия) was a Russian term to describe its political warfare activities both at home and abroad in support of Soviet domestic and foreign policy. Soviet efforts took many forms, ranging from propaganda, forgeries, and general disinformation to assassinations. The measures aimed to damage the enemy's image, create confusion, mould public opinion, and to exploit existing strains in international relations. The Soviet Union dedicated vast resources and attention to these active measures, believing that "mass production of active measures would have a significant cumulative effect over a period of several decades". Soviet active measures were notorious for targeting intended audience's public attitudes, to include prejudices, beliefs, and suspicions deeply rooted in the local history. Soviet campaigns fed disinformation that was psychologically consistent with the audience. Examples of Soviet active measures include:

Operation Trust: was a counterintelligence operation conducted by Soviet intelligence against domestic and foreign adversaries. The operation, which ran from 1921 to 1929, set up a fake anti-Bolshevik underground organization, "Monarchist Union of Central Russia", MUCR (Монархическое объединение Центральной России, МОЦР), which claimed to plan a conspiracy to overthrow the Soviet government. The Trust aimed to create the view that communism was over in Russia and the Soviet Union would abandon its revolutionary ways. Western intelligence services supported the fake anti-Bolshevik dissidents who provided false intelligence reports. The operation's purpose was to identify real dissidents and anti-Bolsheviks, internally and abroad. The operation resulted in the arrests and executions of Russian exile leaders and the general demoralization of anti-Soviet efforts.
The "Rumor" Campaign: In October 1985, a Soviet weekly Literaturnaya Gazeta drew attention to a story in an obscure Indian paper, The Patriot, which alleged that the U.S. government engineered the AIDS virus during biological warfare research in the U.S., and that it was being spread throughout the world by U.S. servicemen who had been used as guinea pigs for the experiment. The story was broadcast by Moscow's Radio Peace and Progress in English and Turkish broadcasts to Asian countries, some of which had important U.S. military bases. The "Rumor" campaign was highly effective in the 1980s and continues to resurface today throughout the world.

Communist strategy and tactics continually focused on revolutionary objectives, "for them the real war is the political warfare waged daily under the guise of peace". the purpose of which is to "disorient and disarm the opposition...to induce the desire to surrender in opposing peoples...to corrode the entire moral, political, and economic infrastructure of a nation". Lenin's mastery of "politics and struggle", remained objectives for the Soviet Union and other global communist regimes, such as the People's Republic of China.

Soviet political warfare in Afghanistan
The Soviet Union remains a comprehensive example of an aggressive nation which expanded its empire through covert infiltration and direct military involvement. Following World War II, the Soviet Union believed European economies would disintegrate, leaving social and economic chaos and allowing for Soviet expansion into new territories. The Soviets quickly deployed organizational weapons such as non-political front groups, sponsored 'spontaneous' mass appeals, and puppet politicians. While many of these countries' political and social structures were in post-war disarray, the Soviet Union's proxy communist parties were well-organized and able to take control of these weak, newly formed Eastern European governments. Moreover, the clandestine operations of the Soviet intelligence services and the occupying forces of the Soviet military further infiltrated the political and social spheres of the new satellites. Conversely, in 1979, the Soviet Union was unable to successfully penetrate the Afghan society after supporting a coup which brought a new Marxist government to power. While Soviet units were already in Kabul, Afghanistan at the time of the coup, additional Soviet troops arrived to reinforce the units and seize important provincial cities, bringing the total of Soviet troops inside Afghanistan to 125,000–140,000. The Soviets were unprepared for the Afghan resistance which included classic guerrilla tactics with foreign support. In 1989, Soviet forces withdrew from Afghanistan, having been unable to infiltrate the Afghan society or immobilize the resistance.

Taiwan

The Republic of China Government in Taiwan recognized that its Communist adversary astutely employed political warfare to capitalize upon Kuomintang weaknesses over the years since Sun Yat-sen first mounted his revolution in the 1920s, and Chiang Kai-shek's regime had come to embrace a political warfare philosophy as both a defensive necessity and as the best foundation for consolidating its power in hope of their optimistic goal of "retaking the mainland". Both the Nationalist and Communist Chinese political warfare doctrines stem from the same historical antecedents at the Whampoa Military Academy in 1924 under Soviet tutelage.

The Nationalist Chinese experience with political warfare can be treated in a much more tangible way than merely tracing doctrinal development. In the Taiwan of the 1970s, the concept was virtually synonymous with the General Political Warfare Department of the Ministry of National Defense, which authored political doctrine and was the culmination of a series of organizational manifestations of its application.

In the 21st century political warfare is primarily the responsibility of the Political Warfare Bureau.

United States

Creation of political warfare capacity

American foreign policy demonstrates a tendency to move towards political warfare in times of tension and perceived threat, and toward public diplomacy in times of improved relations and peace. American use of political warfare depends on its central political vision of the world and its subsequent foreign policy objectives. After World War II, the threat of Soviet expansion brought two new aims for American political warfare:
To restore Western Europe through military, economic, and political support
To weaken the Soviet hold on Eastern Europe through propaganda

President Harry S. Truman established a government political warfare capability in the National Security Act of 1947. The act created the U.S. National Security Council, which became the infrastructure necessary to apply military power to political purposes. Additionally, the United States crafted the Marshall Plan, which provided funding to rebuild, from 1947 to 1951, the European countries devastated by war. President Truman voiced the United States' national, universalist vision for political warfare against the Soviet Union in an address before Congress on March 12, 1947, thereby establishing the Truman Doctrine:

The peoples of a number of countries of the world have recently had totalitarian regimes forced upon them against their will. The Government of the United States has made frequent protests against coercion and intimidation, in violation of the Yalta agreement, in Poland, Rumania, and Bulgaria. I must also state that in a number of other countries there have been similar developments.

One way of life is based upon the will of the majority, and is distinguished by free institutions, representative government, free elections, guarantees of individual liberty, freedom of speech and religion, and freedom from political oppression.

The second way of life is based upon the will of a minority forcibly imposed upon the majority. It relies upon terror and oppression, a controlled press and radio; fixed elections, and the suppression of personal freedoms.

I believe that it must be the policy of the United States to support free peoples who are resisting attempted subjugation by armed minorities or by outside pressures.

I believe that we must assist free peoples to work out their own destinies in their own way.

I believe that our help should be primarily through economic and financial aid which is essential to economic stability and orderly political processes.

The seeds of totalitarian regimes are nurtured by misery and want. They spread and grow in the evil soil of poverty and strife. They reach their full growth when the hope of a people for a better life has died. We must keep that hope alive.

The free peoples of the world look to us for support in maintaining their freedoms.

If we falter in our leadership, we may endanger the peace of the world – and we shall surely endanger the welfare of our own nation.

Containment policy
The Truman Doctrine was the post-WWII basis for American political warfare operations on which the United States government went further to formulate an active, defensive strategy to contain the Soviet threat. On 4 May 1948, George F. Kennan, the father of the containment policy, wrote the Policy Planning Staff Memorandum titled "The Inauguration of Organized Political Warfare". This National Security Council (NSC) memo established a directorate of political warfare operations, under the control of the NSC, known as the Consultative (or Evaluation) Board of the National Security Council. This directorate fell under the authority of the Secretary of State, while the Board had complete authority over covert political operations. It recognized political warfare as one instrument in the United States' grand strategy. Kennan defined 'political warfare' as "the employment of all means at a nation's command, short of war, to achieve its national objectives. Such actions are both overt and covert. They range from such overt actions as political alliances, economic measures (such as ERP – the Marshall Plan), and 'white' propaganda to such covert operations as clandestine support of 'friendly' foreign elements, 'black' psychological warfare and even encouragement of underground resistance in hostile states."

The memo further defined four projects that were activated by the Board to combat growing Communist influence abroad, including:

Liberation Committees: to encourage the formation of a public American organization which will sponsor selected political refugee committees to give support and guidance to national movements gestating in the Soviet World;
Support of indigenous anti-communist elements: within threatened countries of the free world, to include covertly using private intermediaries;
Underground activities behind the Iron Curtain
Preventive direct action in free countries: only in cases of dire necessity. This covert operation involved: control over anti-sabotage activities in the Venezuelan oil fields, American sabotage of Near Eastern oil installations on the verge of Soviet capture, and designation of key individuals threatened by the Kremlin who should be protected or removed elsewhere.

Cold War era

The United States used gray and black propaganda research, broadcasting, and print media operations during the Cold War to achieve its political warfare goals. These operations were conducted against Eastern European targets from Western Europe by two public-private organizations supported partly by the Central Intelligence Agency and the NSC, and partly by private corporations. These organizations were Free Europe, which was launched in 1941 and targeted Eastern Europe, and the American Committee for Liberation (AmComLib) created in 1951 to broadcast information into Soviet Russia. Both were renamed shortly thereafter and combined as Radio Free Europe/Radio Liberty (RFE/RL). Many RFE/RL recruits came either from European emigrants families who were strongly anti-Communist or from US government agencies, most notably from CIA. Officially, "the US government denied any responsibility for the radios and took care to conceal the channels of funding, personnel recruitment, and policy influence. Obviously, the major support was American, but it was plausibly not official American and it could be excluded from diplomatic intercourse and international legal complication." RFE/RL was considered to be a gray operation until its existence was publicly acknowledged by "activists" in the United States during the late 1960s. The goal of the radios was to present the truth to suppressed peoples behind the Iron Curtain "to aid in rebuilding a lively and diversified intellectual life in Europe which could ... defeat Soviet ... incursions on their freedom".

In addition, Voice of America (VOA) started broadcasting to the Soviet citizens in 1947 under the pretext of countering "more harmful instances of Soviet propaganda directed against American leaders and policies" on the part of the internal Soviet Russian-language media. The Soviet Union responded by initiating electronic jamming of VOA broadcasts on April 24, 1949.

In the fall of 1950 a group of scholars including physicists, historians and psychologists from Harvard University, the Massachusetts Institute of Technology and RAND Corporation undertook a research study of psychological warfare for the Department of State. The Project Troy Report to the Secretary of State, presented to Secretary of State on 1 February 1951, made various proposals for political warfare, including possible methods of minimizing the effects of Soviet jamming on the Voice of America broadcasts. It can be assumed that the Truman administration tried to implement plans established by the Project Troy in the project Overload and Delay. The purpose of the latter was to break the Stalinist system by increasing the number of input points in the system and by creating complex and unpredictable situations requiring action.

An overt, non-governmental form of political warfare during the Cold War emerged after President Ronald Reagan's 8 June 1982 speech to the British Parliament. In his speech, Reagan appealed for a "global crusade for democracy" and as a result, the National Endowment for Democracy (NED) was created in December 1983. The NED was a non-governmental organization (NGO) based on four fundamental foundations:

 The National Democratic Institute
 The National Republican Institute to dispense funds and training to politicians and political parties;
 The Center for International Private Enterprise to provide training, funding and networking opportunities for business associations;
 AFL–CIO to assist foreign trade unions.
The NED "funded programs in support of candidates acceptable to the US in elections in Grenada, Panama, El Salvador, and Guatemala throughout 1984 and 1985 in order to prevent communist victories, and create stable pro-US governments". It was also active in Europe, funding groups to carry promote pro-North Atlantic Treaty Organization (NATO) propaganda in Britain, as well as a "right wing French student organisation ... linked to fascist paramilitaries". Other notable efforts included anti-Sandinista propaganda and opposition efforts in Nicaragua as well as anti-Communist propaganda and opposition efforts in support of the Solidarity movement in Poland between 1984 and 1990. According to a 1991 interview in The Washington Post with one of the creators of the NED, Allen Weinstein, "a lot of what we (NED) do today was done covertly 25 years ago by the CIA".

See also

References

Further reading

 Bernays, Edward. "Propaganda" (IG Publishing, 1928).
 Lawrence W. Bielenson, "Power Through Subversion" (Public Affairs Press, 1972).
 Ellul, Jacques. "Propaganda: The Formation of Men's Attitudes". Trans. Konrad Kellen & Jean Lerner. (Random House/Vintage, 1973).
 Linebarger, Paul M. "Psychological Warfare". (International Propaganda and Communications, 1948).
 Carnes Lord and Frank R. Barnett, eds., "Political Warfare and Psychological Operations: Rethinking the US Approach" (National Defense University Press and National Strategy Information Center, 1989).
 Luttwak, Edward. "Coup d'État: A Practical Handbook" (Harvard University Press, 1968).
 Janos Radvanyi, ed., "Psychological Operations and Political Warfare in Long-term Strategic Planning" (Praeger, 1990).
 Smith, Paul A., "On Political War" (National Defense University Press Publications, 1989).

Information operations and warfare
Propaganda techniques

Psychological warfare techniques
Warfare by type
Warfare post-1945